36.5 °C is the 14th studio album by a Japanese singer-songwriter Miyuki Nakajima, released in November 1986.

Track listing

Personnel
Miyuki Nakajima – Lead and backing vocals, acoustic guitar
Masaki Matsubara – Guitar
Kenji Kitajima – Guitar
Fujimal Yoshino – Guitar
Tsugutoshi Goto – Bass guitar
Chiharu Mikuzuki – Bass guitar
Akira Okazawa – Bass guitar
Kouki Ito – Bass guitar
Ichiro Tanaka – Sampling guitar
Eve – Backing vocals
Kazuyo Sugimoto – Backing vocals
Kiyoshi Hiyama – Backing vocals
Yasuhiro Kido – Backing vocals
Stevie Wonder – Synthesizer
Tadashi Nanba – Synthesizer
Hidetoshi Yamada – Synthesizer
Eiji Segawa – Synthesizer
Katsuhiko Kamitsuna – Synthesizer
Elton Nagata – Synthesizer
Nobuo Kurata – Acoustic piano
Hal-Oh Togashi – Electric piano
Joe Hisaishi – Synthesizer programming, sequencer programming and drum machine programming
Kazuo Shiina – Synthesizer programming, sequencer programming and drum machine programming
Motoki Funayama – Synthesizer programming, sequencer programming and drum machine programming
Yasuko Fukuoka – Synthesizer programming, sequencer programming
Hideki Matsutake – Synthesizer programming
Hiroshi Sukegawa – Synthesizer programming
Masato Kawai – Synthesizer Programming
Motoya Hamaguchi – Percussion
Yutaka Uehara – Drums
Hideo Yamaki – Drums
Yuichi Tokashiki – Drums
Jun Aoyama – Drums
Jake H. Concepcion – Alto sax, soprano sax
Kiyoshi Saito – Alto sax

Chart positions

References

1986 albums
Miyuki Nakajima albums
Pony Canyon albums